Mitchell may refer to:

People 

Mitchell (surname)
Mitchell (given name)

Places

Australia 
 Mitchell, Australian Capital Territory, a light-industrial estate
 Mitchell, New South Wales, a suburb of Bathurst
 Mitchell, Northern Territory, a suburb of Palmerston
 Mitchell, Queensland, a town
 Mitchell, South Australia, on lower Eyre Peninsula
 Division of Mitchell, a federal Australian Electoral Division in north-west Sydney, New South Wales 
 Electoral district of Mitchell (Queensland), a former electoral district
 Electoral district of Mitchell (South Australia), a state electoral district 
 Electoral district of Mitchell (Western Australia) a state electoral district
 Shire of Mitchell, a local government area in Victoria

Canada 
 Mitchell, Ontario 
 Mitchell, Manitoba, an unincorporated community
 Mitchell Island, British Columbia
 Mitchell Island (Nunavut)

United Kingdom 
 Mitchell, Cornwall, a village
 Mitchell (UK Parliament constituency)

United States 
 Mitchell, Colorado, an unincorporated community
 Mitchell, Georgia, a town
 Mitchell, Illinois, an unincorporated census-designated place
 Mitchell, Indiana, a city
 Mitchell, Iowa, a city
 Mitchell, Kansas, an unincorporated community
 Mitchell, Missouri, an unincorporated community
 Mitchell, Nebraska, a city
 Mitchell, Oregon, a city
 Mitchell, South Dakota, a city
 Mitchell, South Dakota micropolitan area, anchored by the city
 Mitchell, West Virginia, an unincorporated community
 Mitchell, Wisconsin, a town
 Mitchell Township (disambiguation)

In multiple countries 
 Mitchell County (disambiguation)
 Mitchell Lake (disambiguation)
 Mitchell River (disambiguation)
 Mount Mitchell (disambiguation)

Elsewhere 
 Mitchell (crater), on the Moon

Companies 
 Mitchell Camera Corporation, which manufactured the cameras which shot the majority of Hollywood movies and early television shows from the 1930s-1990s
 Mitchell Construction, a UK-based contractor
 Mitchell Corporation, a Japanese video game company
 Mitchell Electronics, an American manufacturer of electronic devices
 Mitchell International, Inc., a software and information service provider, located in San Diego, California
 Mitchell (automobile), manufactured in Racine, Wisconsin, from 1903 to 1923
 Mitchell (fishing), fishing reel brand owned by Jarden

Ships 
 USS Mitchell, several ships
 USC&GS Mitchell, a United States Coast and Geodetic Survey launch in commission from 1919 to 1944
, a Royal Navy frigate originally named Mitchell

Schools 
 Mitchell College, a private college in New London, Connecticut
 Mitchell Community College, Statesville, North Carolina
 Mitchell High School (disambiguation)
 Mitchell School, Mitchell, Oregon

Other uses 
 B-25 Mitchell, an American World War II-era bomber aircraft
 Mitchell (film), a 1975 action film 
 Mitchell movement, a type of duplicate bridge table movement
 Mitchell Scholarship, given annually by the US-Ireland Alliance
 Mitchell Freeway, Western Australia
 Mitchell Highway, Australia
 Mitchell Center, a multi-purpose arena on the campus of the University of South Alabama in Mobile
 Mitchell Bowl, one of the two semifinal bowls of Canadian Interuniversity Sport men's football
 The Mitchell Trio, or The Chad Mitchell Trio, North American vocal group who became known during the 1960s. At one time included singer John Denver
 Cyclone Mitchell, a tropical cyclone of the 2012–13 Australian region cyclone season

See also 
 Michell, surname
 Mittell, surname
 Mitchellville (disambiguation)
 Justice Mitchell (disambiguation)